The XVI Paloma O'Shea International Piano Competition took place at the Palacio de Festivales in Santander, Spain, from July 25 to August 7, 2008. Twenty pianists, selected through three shortlists of candidates (Madrid, Moscow and New York) took part in the event. The Dresden Philharmonic accompanied the three finalists in the final on August 6. Both the Semi-finals and the Final were broadcast through TVE.

Jury
  Dmitry Alexeev
  Klaus Hellwig
  Jerome Lowenthal
  Luis Pereira Leal
  Sergio Perticaroli
  Jerome Rose
  Jacques Rouvier
  Yang Liqing

 Maria Tipo could not travel to Santander due to health problems.

Competition results, by rounds

First round
July 25–27, 16:00-23:00. Palacio de Festivales, Sala Pereda. Recital. 
 Alina Artemyeva
  Lucas Blondeel
  Stefan Ciric
  Emmanuel Christien
  François Dumont
  Kotarô Fukuma
  Vyacheslav Gryaznov
  Violetta Khachikian
  Ka Ling Colleen Lee
  Hyo Sun Lim
  Wu Muye
  Akiko Nikami
  Yuma Osaki
  Shizuka Susanna Salvemini
  Anastasya Terenkova
  Jue Wang
  Andrey Yaroshinsky
   Avan Yu
  Yubo Zhou
  Zuo Zhang

Second round
July 29-August 1, 16:00-23:00. Palacio de Festivales, Sala Pereda. Recital + Chamber music (quintet).
 Alina Artemyeva
  Lucas Blondeel
  Stefan Ciric
  Emmanuel Christien
  Kotarô Fukuma
  Ka Ling Colleen Lee
  Hyo Sun Lim
  Wu Muye
  Shizuka Susanna Salvemini
  Jue Wang
  Andrey Yaroshinsky
   Avan Yu

Semi-finals
August 3–4, 21:00. Palacio de Festivales, Sala Argenta. Mozart piano concerto.
  Kotarô Fukuma
  Ka Ling Colleen Lee
  Shizuka Susanna Salvemini
  Jue Wang
  Andrey Yaroshinsky
   Avan Yu
Real Philharmonía de Galicia. Juanjo Mena, conductor.

Final
August 6. Palacio de Festivales, Sala Argenta. Symphonic piano concerto. 
  Shizuka Susanna Salvemini
  Jue Wang
   Avan Yu
Dresden Philharmonic. Rafael Frühbeck de Burgos, conductor.

 First Prize: Jue Wang
 Second Prize: Avan Yu
 Third Prize: Shizuka Susanna Salvemini
 Audience Prize: Avan Yu

References

See also
 Paloma O'Shea International Piano Competition

Santander, Spain
Paloma O'Shea International Piano Competition
2008 in Spanish music
July 2008 events in Europe
August 2008 events in Europe